Sadar is the headquarter and a Sub division of West Tripura district in the Indian state of Tripura. Agartala Municipal corporation comes under this Subdivision and had only one block name,Dukli. Sadar sub division has total three revenue circles, Agartala East, Agartala and Dukli. Along with this, there are a total of 13 tehsils and 19 Panchayats .

Demographics 
As per 2011 census, the total population of Sadar sub division is 472,729 out of which males are 242,948 and females are 229,181.

Divisions

References

Tripura
Villages in Tripura
West Tripura district
Villages in India by district